Aechmea amicorum is a species of flowering plant  in the genus Aechmea. This species is endemic to Brazil.

References

amicorum
Flora of Brazil